Inventory Locator Service, LLC  (ILS) is an American company that started the first e-Marketplace for aviation, marine, and defense industries.  ILS has its headquarters in Memphis, Tennessee, United States of America; with relationships globally, especially in North America, through its parent company CAMP Systems, Inc., a subsidiary of Hearst Corporation. Inventory Locator Service was started in May 1979 by John Williams, founder of The Memphis Group, an aircraft parts dealer.  ILS provided a business-to-business marketplace for its subscribers to search among millions of parts and negotiate orders.

History
In 1985, Williams and his three partners became concerned that ILS might be vulnerable to competition and urged selling the company while it was profitable.  The other partners agreed to sell and Ryder System, Inc purchased ILS.  Ryder was a major player in the aircraft parts and service business, but kept ILS operations separate.

In 1988, ILS moved to a new location in Memphis, Tennessee.  A switch in business conduct occurred due to the introduction of DOS software to PC users.  Its first Windows software followed in 1994.

ILS introduced Internet access to its database in 1999-2000.  In 2001, ILS was changed from a Tennessee corporation to a Delaware limited liability company.  It was seeing record usage while other dot-coms folded in the collapse of the Internet bubble.  It had about 6,000 subscribers at the time, and was succeeding in the face of new competition from start-ups, airlines, and OEMs.

On September 16, 2019, Hearst’s Camp Systems International Agrees to Acquire Inventory Locator Service (ILS) from the Boeing Company.  The announcement was made by CAMP President and CEO Vibby Gottemukkala. Pending regulatory approval, ILS, headquartered in Memphis, Tennessee, will become part of CAMP. Terms of the transaction were not disclosed.

Acquisitions
In 1983, Ryder acquired some aviation companies, including Aviation Sales Co. Inc. and its subsidiary General Hydraulics Corporation, of Florida, an aircraft leasing firm and spare parts firm.  Aviall, an aviation solutions provider, was bought by Ryder in 1985.

In 1993, there was a spin-off of Ryder's aviation businesses, including Aviall.  Aviall, Inc., became incorporated in 1993 as an independent global provider of new aviation parts, supply chain management, and other related value-added services to the aerospace aftermarket.  Aviall, Inc. also became the parent company to both Aviall Services, Inc. and ILS.  Later in 2006, Aviall, Inc. was acquired by The Boeing Company.

Services
ILS serves as a data warehouse where information from the FAA and other similar organizations is captured.  Data captured includes PMA data, Airworthiness Directives, Maintenance, Repair and Operations (MRO) Services and Unapproved Parts.  ILS services clients in the aviation, defense and marine industries with its business-to-business electronic marketplace. Ultimately, ILS offers an electronic marketplace for buying and selling within those industries, and provides aftermarket information on supply, demand, and pricing data.

References

External links
ILSmart.com Home Page
NSN Lookup
Industry Eyes Home Page
Eye On Marine Home Page
WebFLIS
Hearst Press Release
FEDLOG

Companies based in Memphis, Tennessee
Business services companies established in 1979